The prix Jeanne-Scialtel was a triennial prize awarded by the Académie française  in literature, created in 1968 by the Académie française and given to professional translators.

In 1994, the Jules Janin foundation and prize, the Langlois, the Pouchard and the Jeanne Scialtel were combined to create the prix Jules Janin.

Laureates
 1969 : Marcelle Sibon for all of his work in translation.
 1972 : Marthe Robert for the translation of the complete works of Kafka.
 1975 : Armel Guerne for translation of the complete works of Novalis.
 1978 : Hervé Belkiri-Deluen and Maurice-Edgar Coindreau for the translation of Tourbillon, by Shelby Foote.  
 1981 : 
 Jean Vauthier for the translation of  Othello, by Shakespeare.
 Jean-Georges Ritz for translation of the poems of Gerard Manley Hopkins.
 1984 : Patrick Reumaux for translations of Dylan Thomas, Steinbeck, Flann O’Brien.
 1987 : Maurice Rambaud for all of his translations.

References

Académie Française awards
Awards established in 1968
Translation awards